The discography of Pulp, an English Britpop band, consists of seven studio albums, nine compilation albums, two live albums and 26 singles. They were formed in 1978 by Jarvis Cocker and had a continuously rotating band membership until 1991. Between 1991 and their hiatus on 15 December 2002, their line-up was largely settled. They rose to prominence during the Britpop era in the early 1990s with their album His 'n' Hers (1994).

Pulp released two albums and eight singles in the 1980s, which garnered little attention from audiences or critics. Their first charting single was "Razzmatazz" (1994), which reached No. 80 in the UK Singles Chart. His 'n' Hers (1994) was their first charting album, peaking at No. 9 in the UK Albums Chart.

As Pulp became part of the Britpop music scene, they scored their first major hits, most notably "Common People" and "Disco 2000". Their 1995 album Different Class was a commercial success, peaking at No. 1 in the UK and going Platinum four times. Two further albums, This Is Hardcore and We Love Life, achieved moderate commercial success.

Fire Records, who own the material from the band's first three albums, re-released Pulp's material several times after they achieved success in a number of compilation albums, most of which had little commercial success.

In 2013, Pulp released the single "After You", written a number of years earlier but never fully finished or released until then. It peaked at No. 101 on the UK Singles Chart and in the Top 10 of the UK Indie chart.

Albums

Studio albums

Compilation albums

Live albums

Box sets

Singles and EPs

Other appearances

A  "Grandfather's Nursery" was also released as a free download track by Amazon.com in 2002.

Other appearances

Video

Video albums

Music videos

References
General

Specific

Notes

External links
 
 

Discographies of British artists
Pulp